The 42nd edition of the World Allround Speed Skating Championships for Women took place on 6 and 7 February in Sainte-Foy, Quebec City at the Gaétan-Boucher ice rink.

Title holder was Natalya Petrusyova from the USSR.

Distance medalists

Classification

 * = Fall

Source:

References

Attribution
In Dutch

1980s in speed skating
1980s in women's speed skating
1981 World Allround
1981 in women's speed skating